Project ALS is a non-profit organization whose mission is to identify and support leading scientific research toward the first effective treatments and a cure for ALS. Founded in 1998 by Jenifer Estess, Valerie Estess, Meredith Estess, and Julianne Hoffenberg, Project ALS recruits scientists and doctors to work together toward a better understanding of ALS and other closely related neuro-degenerative diseases.

History 
Project ALS was founded in 1998 as a non-profit organization when Jenifer Estess, a 35-year-old New York theater and film producer, was diagnosed with ALS. Historically, scientists working separately on various aspects of the disease conducted ALS research. Project ALS changed that approach by requiring that researchers and doctors work together, share data openly, and meet research milestones.

Project ALS's Research Advisory Board (RAB) brings together accomplished scientists to seek out the most promising research and set the agenda for the entire research field.

Celebrity involvement 

The following people and groups have been involved with Project ALS:
 Julianna Margulies
 Anne Meara
 Caroline Rhea
 Debora Spar
 Thomas Jessel
 Northport High School
 Donna Hanover
 Edie Falco
 Ben Stiller

References

External links 
 Project ALS

Charities based in New York City
Organizations established in 1998
Health charities in the United States
Neurology organizations
Amyotrophic lateral sclerosis
Medical and health organizations based in New York City
1998 establishments in New York City